The Confederate States dollar was first issued just before the outbreak of the American Civil War by the newly formed Confederacy. It was not backed by hard assets, but simply by a promise to pay the bearer after the war, on the prospect of Southern victory and independence. As the Civil War progressed and victory for the South seemed less and less likely, its value declined. After the Confederacy's defeat, its money had no value, and both individuals and banks lost large sums.

As the war began to tilt against the Confederates, confidence in the currency diminished, and the government inflated the currency by continuing to print unbacked banknotes. By the end of 1863, the Confederate dollar (or "Greyback", to distinguish it from the then-new "Greenback" paper US dollar, which was likewise put into circulation during the war) was quoted at just six cents in gold, and fell further still.

The Greyback is now a prized collector's item, in its many versions, including those issued by individual states and local banks. The various engravings of leading Confederates, gods and goddesses, trains, ships and slaves on these hastily printed banknotes, sometimes cut with scissors and signed by clerks, continue to stimulate debate among antique dealers, with even some of the counterfeit notes commanding high prices.

Background
The Confederate dollar, often called a "Greyback", was first issued into circulation in April 1861, when the Confederacy was only two months old, and on the eve of the outbreak of the Civil War.

At first, Confederate currency was accepted throughout the South as a medium of exchange with high purchasing power.  As the war progressed, confidence in the ultimate success waned, the amount of paper money increased, and their dates of redemption were extended further into the future. Most Confederate currency carried the phrase across the top of the bill: "SIX MONTHS AFTER THE RATIFICATION OF A TREATY OF PEACE BETWEEN THE CONFEDERATE STATES AND THE UNITED STATES" then across the middle, the "CONFEDERATE STATES OF AMERICA WILL PAY [amount of bill] TO BEARER" (or "...WILL PAY TO BEARER [amount of bill]" or "...WILL PAY TO BEARER ON DEMAND [amount of bill]").

As the war progressed, the currency underwent the depreciation and soaring prices characteristic of inflation. For example, when news of the Confederate defeat at Gettysburg reached the public, the Confederate currency depreciated 20%. Confederate President Jefferson Davis asked private citizens to restore the value of the Confederate dollar by mutually agreeing to sell and buy items only at reduced prices. In September 1864, one Confederate dollar was worth the same as three cents of United States currency. People tried to retain their wealth by buying gold to such an extent that, in Richmond, it was impossible to find someone who would sell their gold.

Near the end of the war, the currency became practically worthless as a medium of exchange. This was because, for the most part, Confederate currency was bills of credit, as in the Revolutionary War, not secured or backed by any assets. The only two exceptions were in Mississippi, where in 1862 a series of notes were issued with the backing of cotton stored by the state's planters and in Florida, where notes were backed, in theory, by public lands. Just as the currency issued by the Continental Congress was deemed worthless (witness the phrase "not worth a Continental;" and see The Federalist Papers, which also addressed this issue in the run-up to the ratification of the U.S. Constitution) because they were not backed by any hard assets, this too became the case with Confederate currency. Even though gold and silver may have been scarce, some economic historians  have suggested that the currency would have retained a relatively material degree of value, and for a longer period of time, had it been backed by hard goods the Confederacy did have, such as cotton or tobacco. When the Confederacy ceased to exist as a political entity at the end of the war, the money lost all value as fiat currency.

Designs

The Confederacy, being limited in skilled engravers and printers as well as secure printing facilities, often had to make do with unrelated designs in early banknote issues.  Some such were abstract depictions of mythological gods and goddesses, such as the Goddess of Liberty.  Typical Confederate themes included naval ships and historical figures, including George Washington.  Of the 72 notes issued by the Confederate States of America, five designs depicted slaves.

Since most engravers and bank plates were in the Northern states, Confederate printers used offset or lithographic process to copy scenes that had been used on whatever notes they had access to. Many variations in plates, printing and papers also appear in most of the issues, due in large part to the limits on commerce resulting from the Union blockade and the inadequate Confederate railroads in the American Civil War.

People featured on banknotes include Andrew Jackson, John C. Calhoun, Christopher Memminger, Robert M. T. Hunter, Alexander H. Stephens, Jefferson Davis, Judah P. Benjamin, Clement Clay, George W. Randolph, and Lucy Holcombe Pickens, the wife of the Governor of South Carolina.  There was also a bill featuring George Washington.

Signatures

Confederate Treasury Notes were hand signed by various clerks, with exception of the 50 cent issues that had the printed signatures of Robert Tyler and Edward C. Elmore.  The first six notes issued were hand signed by the Register and Treasurer themselves.  While hand signatures were considered an anti-counterfeiting tool, the sheer number of bills being produced could not reasonably be signed individually by two men each. Women were often hired as clerks to sign "for Register" and "for Treasurer". Up to 200 clerks were eventually hired for each.

Coinage

As the Civil War continued, the cost of the war loomed large. Any precious metals available in the South often made their way to Europe to procure war goods.  But the CSA did manage to mint a few coins. In 1861, Robert Lovett Jr. of Philadelphia was commissioned to design, engrave and make a one cent piece for the Confederacy. On the obverse (front), he used the head of Minerva (French Liberty Head), which he had used on several store cards. The coins were struck using the then Federal standard of cupronickel for cent pieces. He made a few samples, of which only 12 are said to exist by the popular stories but research has shown that 14 are currently known to exist. Fearing prosecution for aiding the enemy, he stopped his work and hid the coins and dies in his cellar.  The original dies were purchased later and used to make restrikes, first by John W. Haseltine and later by Robert S. Bashlow. The dies were donated to the Smithsonian Institution by Bashlow in 1962.

In the aftermath of secession, the Confederacy seized U.S. Mint facilities at Charlotte, North Carolina, Dahlonega, Georgia, and New Orleans, Louisiana. After seizing and appropriating the bullion reserves stored at the facilities, the Confederate Treasury, led by C. G. Memminger, determined that the cost of minting coins far outweighed the benefits. Circulating specie would be virtually nonexistent in the Confederacy throughout the entirety of the war. A wide variety of local token and scrip would attempt to fill this void, to little avail.

In late April 1861, four Confederate half dollars were struck on a hand press by employees of the New Orleans Mint. Because of the high relief of the coin die, a test striking was made to determine if coins would release from the Confederate die. The die was made by a printing plate engraver (A.H.M. Peterson) in New Orleans who was unfamiliar with techniques required to engrave coining dies. These coins were struck using a U.S. obverse die (Seated Liberty) and the Confederate die made by Peterson. These coins are known as originals, and the location of all four of the coins is known today.

As the result of an 1879 article about the Confederate cent printed in a New York City newspaper, Benjamin F. Taylor, M.D. (Chief Coiner, New Orleans Mint, CSA) contacted coin dealer Ebenezer Mason. Taylor informed Mason of the existence of the Confederate half dollar and the die. Mason bought the die and coin from Taylor and sold them to J.W. Scott Co. of New York City, a coin and stamp dealer. Scott bought 500 1861 United States half dollars from a New York bank that were supposedly struck at the New Orleans Mint. Scott had the reverse of the half dollars planed down and performed a one-sided strike using the Confederate half dollar die. The Seated Liberty obverse of the coins were flattened some because of the one-sided strike. In addition, Scott struck 500 half dollar-sized tokens in white metal using the Confederate die and a newly made die to commemorate the restrikes of the Confederate half dollars. The Confederate half dollar die went missing during the 1920s and has not been seen since.

Popular stories claim one of the Confederate half dollars was given to Confederate President Jefferson Davis. This story has no basis in fact. In an 1879 letter to Ebenezer Mason, Davis confirmed that a Union soldier (actually a Federal Officer) stole a coin from one of his wife's trunks, but could not confirm that it was like the then known Confederate half dollar. It is possible that the coin was a gold so-called Jefferson Davis dime struck at the Paris (France) Mint, which Davis described to coin dealer Ed Frossard in an 1880 letter. All known Jefferson Davis dimes were struck in silver at the Paris Mint. The Davis letter is the only known reference to a gold specimen, which was likely a special presentation piece made for Davis.

Banknotes
Confederate Treasury Notes (banknotes) were ultimately issued in 50¢,  and  denominations with a variety of designs, issuers and redeemable obligations.  The amount of currency issued under the various acts of the Confederate Congress totaled .7 billion.  Bills were released in 72 different note "types" in seven "series" from 1861 through 1864.

Since there were many types of Confederate notes as well as notes issued by the states of the Confederacy, and since banks could issue their own notes, counterfeiting was a major problem for the Confederacy.  Many of these contemporary counterfeits are identifiable today and they can be as valuable to a collector as a real note.

Confederate dollars and coins remain the subject of a lively trade, with careful grading of damage and deterioration similar to booksellers' gradings.

Series of CSA notes

Banknote printers and engravers

Complete typeset of CSA banknotes

See also

 Economy of the Confederate States of America
 Fourteenth Amendment to the United States Constitution, which banned the Federal recognition of Confederate debts or currency.
 Texas dollar
 United States currency
 Samuel C. Upham, a notorious counterfeiter of Confederate bills.

Notes

References

Bibliography

External links

 The Story of Confederate Currency
 Collecting Confederate Paper Money
 Professional Grading Service
 Coin Facts
 Mintmark Numismatics, Inc
 Photos and descriptions of Confederate Currency in McCune Collection
 Boston Athenæum: Paper Currency from the Confederate States of America, Digital Collection
 Civil War Confederate Currency Collection from Georgia State University

1861 establishments in the Confederate States of America
Economic history of the American Civil War
Confederate States of America currency
Currencies introduced in 1861